Đăk Glei is a rural district (huyện) of Kon Tum province in the Central Highlands region of Vietnam. As of 2003 the district had a population of 31,166. The district covers an area of 1,485 km². The district capital lies at Đăk Glei.

References

Districts of Kon Tum province